Luke Anthony Hall (born 8 July 1986) is a British politician and former retail manager who has served as the Member of Parliament (MP) for Thornbury and Yate since 2015. A member of the Conservative Party, he served as Minister of State for Regional Growth and Local Government from 2020 to 2021.

Early life
Luke Hall was born in the village of Westerleigh on 8 July 1986 and grew up in South Gloucestershire. He worked for the supermarket chain Lidl from the age of 18 and became manager of their Yate store, before going on to become Area Manager for Farmfoods. Hall became an active member of the Conservative Party aged 23 and went on to become Constituency Chairman for the party in South Gloucestershire and Deputy Chairman of the Bristol and South Gloucestershire Conservatives.

Parliamentary career
Hall was selected as the Conservative candidate for the Thornbury and Yate seat in December 2013 and went on to gain it at the 2015 general election by closely defeating the Liberal Democrat Pensions Minister Steve Webb.

In May 2016, it emerged that Hall was one of a number of Conservative MPs being investigated by police in the United Kingdom general election, 2015 party spending investigation, for allegedly spending more than the legal limit on constituency election campaign expenses. However, in May 2017, the Crown Prosecution Service said that while there was evidence of inaccurate spending returns, it did not "meet the test" for further action.

He was re-elected at the 2017 general election with an increased majority, and made a Parliamentary Private Secretary to the ministerial team in the Department for Education.

In Parliament, Hall currently serves on the Petitions Committee, having previously served on the Environmental Audit Select Committee and Work and Pensions Committee.

He was opposed to Brexit prior to the 2016 referendum. Since the result was announced, Hall has continued to support the official position of his party and now advocates leaving the European Union. He has never rebelled against the Government in the current Parliament.

In July 2019, Hall joined the Department for Housing, Communities and Local Government as Parliamentary Under-Secretary of State. In April 2020, he was appointed to focus on rough sleeping and housing. In June 2020, Hall proposed to reduce homelessness during the coronavirus pandemic by calling on local councils to encourage rough sleepers to "move in with family and friends". His portfolio changed to the Minister of State focusing on regional growth and local government at the Ministry of Housing, Communities and Local Government, when he replaced Simon Clarke in September 2020.

On 16 September 2021, Hall left the government during the second cabinet reshuffle of the second Johnson ministry and returned to the backbenches.

On 7 July 2022, Hall resigned as the Deputy Chair of the Conservative Party, after over 50 other resignations during the July 2022 United Kingdom government crisis.

Personal life
Hall lives with his wife in Horton, and in London.

Notes

References

External links

 

1986 births
Living people
Conservative Party (UK) MPs for English constituencies
UK MPs 2015–2017
UK MPs 2017–2019
UK MPs 2019–present
People from Westerleigh